Prince Richard, Duke of Gloucester,  (Richard Alexander Walter George; born 26 August 1944) is a member of the British royal family. He is the second son of Prince Henry, Duke of Gloucester, and Princess Alice, Duchess of Gloucester, and the youngest of the nine grandchildren of King George V and Queen Mary. He is currently 30th in the line of succession to the British throne, and the highest person on the list who is not a descendant of George VI, who was his uncle. At the time of his birth, he was 5th in line to the throne.

Prince Richard practised as an architect until the death of his elder brother, William, placed him in direct line to inherit his father's dukedom of Gloucester, which he assumed in 1974. He married Birgitte van Deurs Henriksen in July 1972. They have three children.

Early life

Prince Richard was born on 26 August 1944 at 12:15 pm at St Matthew's Nursing Home in Northampton, the second son of Prince Henry, Duke of Gloucester and Princess Alice, Duchess of Gloucester. His father was the third son of King George V and Queen Mary. His mother was the third daughter of the 7th Duke of Buccleuch and Lady Margaret Bridgeman. At the time of his birth, he was second in line to his father's dukedom, behind his elder brother, Prince William of Gloucester, who died in 1972 before inheriting the title and having any children of his own. Richard was baptised at the Royal Chapel of All Saints in Windsor Great Park on 20 October 1944 by the retired Archbishop of Canterbury, Cosmo Gordon Lang. When Richard was four months old, he accompanied his parents to Australia, where his father served as governor-general from 1945 to 1947. The family returned to Barnwell Manor in 1947, where Richard spent most of his childhood.

Education and career 
Prince Richard's early education took place at home, under the instruction of Rosalind Ramirez, who had also tutored young King Faisal II of Iraq; later, he attended Wellesley House School at Broadstairs and Eton College. In 1963, he matriculated at Magdalene College, Cambridge, where he read architecture, graduating with the degree of Bachelor of Arts in June 1966. As is customary at Cambridge, this was promoted to MA (Cantab) in 1971.

In 1966, Prince Richard joined the Offices Development Group in the Ministry of Public Building and Works for a year of practical work. He returned to Cambridge in 1967, completing both parts of the Diploma in Architecture degree in June 1969. Upon passing his exams, he became a practising partner with Hunt Thompson Associates, Architects, in London.

Marriage and family

On 8 July 1972, Richard married the Danish-born Birgitte van Deurs Henriksen in St Andrew's Church at Barnwell, Northamptonshire; they have three children:

 Alexander Patrick Gregers Richard Windsor, Earl of Ulster (born 24 October 1974 at St Mary's Hospital, London); he married Claire Booth in 2002. The couple have two children.
 Lady Davina Elizabeth Alice Benedikte Windsor (born 19 November 1977 at St Mary's Hospital, London); she married Gary Lewis in 2004, and they divorced in 2018. They have two children.
 Lady Rose Victoria Birgitte Louise Gilman (born 1 March 1980 at St Mary's Hospital, London); she married George Gilman in 2008. The couple have two children.
The Duke and Duchess of Gloucester's official residence is at Kensington Palace in London. They have leased their private home, Barnwell Manor, since 1994. In September 2022, the Duke put the manor up for sale for £4.75 million.

Activities
Richard ended his architectural career in 1972, after the death of his elder brother Prince William, who crashed his plane in a flying competition. Richard became heir apparent to his father's dukedom and had to take on additional family obligations and royal duties on behalf of the Queen. He became the second Duke of Gloucester (in the fifth creation of that title) upon the death of his father on 10 June 1974.

Richard was elected as a corporate member of the Royal Institute of British Architects (and FRIBA) in 1972. He is president of the Society of Architect Artists. He also serves as a commissioner of the Historic Building and Monuments Commission for England (English Heritage). He has been patron of construction charity Construction Youth Trust for many years. With his background in architecture, the Duke of Gloucester takes interest in the work of the trust and frequently visits their projects, in addition to giving his name to their long standing Duke of Gloucester Young Achiever's Scheme Awards. The Duke is also patron of the Architects Benevolent Society. The Duke is also vice president of Lepra, a UK based charity working towards a world free from prejudice and disability due to leprosy. As part of his active involvement in this role, he attends national and international events in support of the charity's work. He is royal patron of the UK branch of the charity Habitat for Humanity, royal patron of the St. George's Society of New York, and president of The London Society. A keen motorist, Prince Richard passed the Advanced Driving Test of the Institute of Advanced Motorists, of which he was president for more than 32 years. On his appointment in 1971, it was recorded that the new president was "currently [driving] an Austin 1300", reflecting the modest image with which he has always been identified. He stood down as president in January 2005.

The Duke of Gloucester, accompanied by the Duchess, represented his cousin Elizabeth II at the Solomon Islands independence celebrations on 7 July 1978. He served as a judge in Prince Edward's charity television special The Grand Knockout Tournament on 15 June 1987.

On 10 April 2008, the Duke of Gloucester was officially installed as inaugural Chancellor of the University of Worcester at a ceremony in Worcester Cathedral. In this role, the Prince officiates at degree ceremonies and major events, as well as promoting the university overseas. The Duke carried out the first of these duties on 5 and 6 November 2008 at the Graduation Award Ceremonies. The Duke is also patron of the Severn Valley Railway and the Pestalozzi International Village Trust. He is patron of the British Homeopathic Association, a charity dedicated to the study, research and promotion of homeopathy. He shares a name with another Duke of Gloucester, Richard III, and has been the patron of the Richard III Society since 1980. He is also a member of the international advisory board of the Royal United Services Institute. Since 1972, the Duke has been a corporate member of the Royal Institute of British Architects. He is also an honorary fellow of the Institution of Structural Engineers. He has long been patron of the Richard III Society, sharing that monarch's forename and pre-reign title.

During 2009, the Duke became patron of the De Havilland Aircraft Heritage Centre in support of its bid to raise funds through private means and through a bid for Heritage Lottery Funding. Other patronages include: British Society of Soil Science, the International Council on Monuments and Sites, Action on Smoking and Health, British Association of Friends of Museums, British Mexican Society, St Bartholomew's Hospital, as well as numerous other organisations and charities. In July 2011, the Duke visited the Isle of Man to meet with the representative of Manx National Heritage and the Council of Cancer Charities. On 8 November 2011, he opened the new Law School Building at the University of Hertfordshire on the de Havilland campus site of the former de Havilland Aircraft factory. On 19 March 2013, the Duke represented Elizabeth II at the Vatican for the inauguration of Pope Francis.

On 11 March 2015, the Duke visited the Royal School Dungannon in Dungannon, County Tyrone, Northern Ireland, to celebrate their 400th anniversary since the founding of the school; presenting a commemorative plaque and raising an anniversary flag on the grounds. On 22 and 26 March 2015, the Duke represented the Queen at the ceremonies marking the reburial and commemorations of King Richard III in Leicester Cathedral. Richard III had held the title Duke of Gloucester before his ascension to the English throne. In March 2018, the Duke travelled to Malawi to attend the Commonwealth Day celebrations, and visited projects related to health services, wildlife, and climate change. He missed the celebrations in March 2022 after testing positive for COVID-19.

On 14 September 2022, after the death of Queen Elizabeth II on 8 September, the Duke joined her children, grandsons, nephew, and son-in-law, in walking in the state cortege from Buckingham Palace to Westminster Hall, for her lying in state.

Titles, styles, honours and arms

Titles and styles
 26 August 1944 – 10 June 1974: His Royal Highness Prince Richard of Gloucester
 10 June 1974 – present: His Royal Highness The Duke of Gloucester

Honours

  2 June 1953: Queen Elizabeth II Coronation Medal
  1 January 1974: Knight Grand Cross of the Royal Victorian Order (GCVO)
  1975: Grand Prior and Bailiff Grand Cross of the Order of St John (GCStJ)
  6 February 1977: Queen Elizabeth II Silver Jubilee Medal
  1978: Solomon Islands Independence Medal
  1980: Vanuatu Independence Medal
  1980: Badge of Honour, New Hebrides
  1984: Service Medal of the Order of St John (with 5th bar (2 gold bars))
  1997: Royal Knight of the Most Noble Order of the Garter (KG)
  6 February 2002: Queen Elizabeth II Golden Jubilee Medal
  4 August 2008: Star of the Solomon Islands (SSI)
  6 February 2012: Queen Elizabeth II Diamond Jubilee Medal
  6 February 2022: Queen Elizabeth II Platinum Jubilee Medal

Foreign
  1973: Knight Grand Cross of the Order of St. Olav
  1 August 2008: Knight Grand Cross with Collar of the Order of the Crown of Tonga
  
 2015: Sash of Special Category of the Order of the Aztec Eagle
 1973: Sash of the Order of the Aztec Eagle
  1975: Commander Grand Cross of the Order of the Polar Star
  1975: Member, 1st Class of the Order of Tri Shakti Patta
  24 February 1975: Nepalese Coronation Medal

Honorary military appointments
 Australia
  Colonel-in-Chief, of the Royal Australian Army Education Corps

 New Zealand
  Colonel-in-Chief of the Royal New Zealand Army Medical Corps

 United Kingdom
  Colonel-in-Chief, of the Royal Anglian Regiment
  Colonel-in-Chief, of the Royal Army Medical Corps
  Deputy Colonel-in-Chief, of the Royal Logistic Corps
  Royal Colonel, of the 6th (V) Battalion, The Rifles
  The Royal Honorary Colonel, of the Royal Monmouthshire Royal Engineers (Militia)
  Honorary Air Commodore, of RAF Odiham
  Honorary Air Commodore, of 501 (County of Gloucester) Squadron, Royal Auxiliary Air Force, 16 June 2001.
  Honorary Air Marshal, Royal Air Force, 1 September 1996.

Arms

Issue

Ancestry

See also
 British prince
 Most Venerable Order of the Hospital of St John of Jerusalem

References

External links

 The Duke of Gloucester at the Royal Family website
 

1944 births
Living people
20th-century British architects
21st-century British people
Alumni of Magdalene College, Cambridge
Architects from London
Bailiffs Grand Cross of the Order of St John
Barons Culloden
British Anglicans
British landowners
British princes
Commanders Grand Cross of the Order of the Polar Star
Dukes of Gloucester
Earls of Ulster (1928 creation)
Fellows of the Royal Institute of British Architects
Fellows of the Society of Antiquaries of London
Gloucester
Honorary air commodores
Richard, Duke of Gloucester
Knights of the Garter
Knights Grand Cross of the Order of the Crown of Tonga
Military personnel from Northamptonshire
People educated at Eton College
People from Northampton
Richard, Duke of Gloucester
Royal Air Force air marshals